La Présentation is a municipality in southern Quebec, Canada on the Salvail River in Les Maskoutains Regional County Municipality. The population as of the Canada 2011 Census was 2,466.

Demographics

Population

Language

Communities
La Présentation
Salvail

See also
List of municipalities in Quebec

References

External links

Incorporated places in Les Maskoutains Regional County Municipality
Municipalities in Quebec